This is a list of fictional nurses, consisting of nurses having significant roles in notable fictional works.

Fictional nurses

A
 Haleh Adams from the television series ER
 Terri Alden from the situation comedy Three's Company
 Mikuru Asahina from The Melancholy of Haruhi Suzumiya

B
 Sue Barton from the series of novels of the same name
 Nisha Batra from the British soap opera Brookside
 Hillary Bauer from the soap opera Guiding Light
 Dee Bliss from the Australian soap opera Neighbours
 Jana Brandner from German soap opera Verbotene Liebe
 Kim Butterfield from the British soap opera Hollyoaks
 Lindsey Butterfield from the British soap opera Hollyoaks
 Caroline Buxton from the New Zealand soap opera Shortland Street

C
 Christine Chapel from Star Trek: The Original Series
 Malma Chaudury from the British soap opera EastEnders
 Kirsty Clements from the British drama Casualty
 Scarlett Conway from the British drama Casualty
 Nurse Cramer from Joseph Heller's novel Catch-22
 Nadine Crowell from the soap opera General Hospital
 Ellen Crozier from the New Zealand soap opera Shortland Street

D
 Shirley Daniels from the television series St. Elsewhere
 Nurse Duckett from Joseph Heller's novel Catch-22
 Lisa "Duffy" Duffin from the British drama Casualty
 Madiha Durrani from the British drama Casualty
 Annie Dutton from the soap opera Guiding Light

E
 Eliza, the lost love of Faust VIII in the manga and anime of Shaman King
 Carla Espinosa from the situation comedy Scrubs

F
 Charlie Fairhead from the British medical drama Casualty
 Fanny from the fighting video game Guilty Gear Petit
 Gaylord "Greg" Focker from the films Meet the Parents and Meet the Fockers
 Kitty Forman from the sitcom That '70s Show
 Jane Foster from The Mighty Thor comic book
 Sonia Fowler from the British soap opera EastEnders

G
 Lisa Garland from survival horror Silent Hill series of video games

H
 Audrey March Hardy from the soap opera General Hospital
 Haruhara Haruko, in a brief instance in the first episode of the anime series FLCL
 Ruby Haswell from the British soap opera Emmerdale
 Carol Hathaway from the television series ER
 Hello Nurse from the animated television series Animaniacs
 David Hide from the British drama Casualty
 Marie Horton from the soap opera Days of Our Lives
 Margaret "Hot Lips" Houlihan from M*A*S*H

J
 Lily Jarvik from the television series ER
 Maia Jeffries from the New Zealand soap opera Shortland Street
 Tania Jeffries from the New Zealand soap opera Shortland Street
 Epiphany Johnson from the soap opera General Hospital
 Nurse Joy from Pokémon
 Naomi Julien  from the soap opera EastEnders
 Meena Jutla from the soap opera Emmerdale

K
 Asuna Karino from Kamen Rider Ex-Aid
 Maria Kendall from the television series Holby City
 Katya Kinski from the Australian soap opera Neighbours
 Marty Kirkby from the British drama Casualty
 Vinnie Kruse from the New Zealand soap opera Shortland Street

L
 Ayesha Lee from the British soap opera Doctors
 Abby Lockhart from the television series ER
 Peri Lomax from the British soap opera Hollyoaks
 Tegan Lomax from the British soap opera Hollyoaks
 Jade Lovall from the British drama Casualty

M
 Chuny Marquez from the television series ER
 Jacob Masters from the British drama Casualty
 Malik McGrath from the television series ER
 Luca McIntyre from the British soap Doctors
 Celine McQueen from the British soap opera Hollyoaks
 Cleo McQueen from the British soap Hollyoaks
 Robyn Miller from the British drama Casualty
 Steve Mills from the New Zealand soap opera Shortland Street
 Faye Morton from the television series Holby City

N
 Amazing Nurse Nanako from the anime of the same title
 Bryan Nolan from the soap opera EastEnders
 Lynsey Nolan from the British soap opera Hollyoaks

O
 Alyssa Ogawa from the television series Star Trek: The Next Generation and the movie Star Trek: First Contact

P
 Lucy Papandrao from the television series St. Elsewhere
 Tom Paris from the television series Star Trek: Voyager
 Ann Perkins from the NBC television series Parks and Recreation
 Peter Petrelli from the television series Heroes
 Nina Pickering from the British supernatural television series Being Human
 Pinoko from Osamu Tezuka's manga and later anime, Black Jack
 Poppy Pomfrey from the Harry Potter universe
 Tiffany Pratt from the New Zealand soap opera Shortland Street
 Miss Preen from the play and film The Man Who Came to Dinner

R
 Nurse Ratched from Ken Kesey's novel One Flew Over the Cuckoo's Nest
 Mildred Ratched from the Netflix adaptation Ratched
 Megan Roach from the British drama Casualty
 Laverne Roberts from the situation comedy Scrubs
 Selina Roberts from the soap opera Home and Away

S
 Tina Seabrook from the British drama Casualty
 Peggy Shotwell from the television drama St. Elsewhere
 Zac Smith from the New Zealand soap opera Shortland Street
 Bobbie Spencer  from the soap opera General Hospital
 Rita Stapleton Bauer from the soap opera Guiding Light

T
 Samantha Taggart from ER
 Claire Temple from the television series Daredevil
 Mikan Tsumiki from Danganronpa 2: Goodbye Despair

W
 Toni Warner from the New Zealand soap opera Shortland Street
 Elizabeth Webber from the soap opera General Hospital
 Chrissie Williams from the television series Holby City
 Rory Williams from the television series Doctor Who
 Lydia Wright from the television series ER

Y
 Mary Alice Young from the television series Desperate Housewives

See also

 List of fictional doctors

References

Nurses